Selin Niyazi Ali (born 14 February 2002) is a Bulgarian sports shooter. She competed in the women's trap event at the 2020 Summer Olympics.

Career 
She competed at the 2019 Junior World Championships, winning a gold medal, 2019 ISSF Junior World Cup, winning a silver medal. She competed in mixed events, with Ivan Georgiev.

References

External links
 

2002 births
Living people
Bulgarian female sport shooters
Olympic shooters of Bulgaria
Shooters at the 2020 Summer Olympics
People from Aytos
21st-century Bulgarian women